The Incredible Sex Revolution is a 1965 film directed by Albert Zugsmith starring Hampton Fancher.

References

External links
The Incredible Sex Revolution at TCMDB

1965 films
American sex comedy films
American black-and-white films
1960s sex comedy films
1965 comedy films
1960s English-language films
Films directed by Albert Zugsmith
1960s American films